Rájec is a municipality and village in Šumperk District in the Olomouc Region of the Czech Republic. It has about 500 inhabitants.

References

Villages in Šumperk District